The Gun River Formation is a geologic formation in Quebec. It preserves fossils dating back to the early Silurian period.

Description
The formation is divided into 4 members (from the base up): the Lachute, Innommée, Sandtop and Macgilvray members. The formation was deposited some 40–80 km offshore from the stable Laurentian craton, underwater at depths of 30 to 60 meters.

Fossil content

Vertebrates

Invertebrates

See also

 List of fossiliferous stratigraphic units in Quebec

References

 

Silurian Quebec
Silurian southern paleotemperate deposits
Silurian southern paleotropical deposits